The 2021 TBL season is the fourth season of The Basketball League (TBL). The season began in April and the teams are each scheduled to play 24 games.

The league announced several new teams for the 2021 season, expanding from 12 teams in the COVID-19 pandemic curtailed 2020 season to 36 teams . Several of the added teams came from the semi-professional American Basketball Association such as the California Sea-Kings, San Diego Guardians, and Syracuse Stallions. The expansions included a new Shreveport Mavericks, as well as the Atlanta Empire, Charleston/Carolina Coyotes, Detroit Hustle, Enid Outlaws, Flint United, Houston Push, Kokomo BobKats, Little Rock Lightning, Midtown Prestige, Omaha's Finest, South Shore Monarchs, Vegas Ballers, Waco Royals, and West Coast Breeze.

In addition, this season marked the first time two female head coaches led professional men's basketball teams: Angela Weathers of the Dallas Skyline and Daria Carrington of the West Coast Breeze.   

Due to difficult business conditions of certain markets and availability of venues due to the ongoing pandemic, the existing Albany Patroons, and the announced expansion teams the Avon Aces, Fresno Fire, Portland Storm, Salem Capitals, and Temecula Eagles opted not to play this season. As of April 2021, all but the Fresno Fire are still listed as returning in 2022.

Standings
Final standings:

x – qualified for playoffs; z – Conference champion

Central Conference

East Conference

Midwest Conference

West Conference

Playoffs

TBL Western Conference 
San Diego Guardians (1) received bye of first round
California Sea Kings (2) received bye of first round

References

External links
TBL website

The Basketball League seasons
TBL Draft